David Smart (1824 – 13 October 1914) was a Scottish architect, prominent in the second half of the 19th century. His design genre varied between municipal buildings, schools and churches, but he worked almost exclusively in Perthshire.

Early life
Smart was born in Alyth, Perth and Kinross, in 1824.

Career
Although it is not known with whom he first apprenticed, he worked for many years in the office of David Bryce. It is rumoured that a disagreement in that office resulted in Smart leaving to take over the practice of William Macdonald Mackenzie from his widow in 1858. The quarrel was settled amicably.

By the late 1870s, Smart was worked with a relative, James Smart, who was his partner from around 1887. Their firm was D & J Smart. The partnership was dissolved shortly before the turn of the century, possibly due to the readmission of James Smart's son, John (born 1872), to the practice.

David retained the office at 42 Tay Street in Perth, while James opened his at 28 York Place as James Smart & Son.

In 1907, David Smart began a partnership with his senior assistant Donald Alexander Stewart (born 1876), who had been articled to Smart since 1892. The firm became known as Smart & Stewart.

Smart retired around 1911 at the age of 86.

Selected notable works

Battleby, near Luncarty (1862)
Balhousie Castle (1862) – restoration and enlargement
54 Tay Street (1866)
Perth Sheriff Court and County Buildings, Perth (1866) – rebuilding of courtroom section of Sir Robert Smirke's building on square plan; internal remodelling and new buildings on South Street
Station Hotel, Perth (1866) – not the same building as today's Station Hotel, but was on the same street
Perth Royal Infirmary (original location; 1867) – relocated and reconstructed William Mackenzie's lodge in a different form
Brand's Building, South Street, Perth (1899)

Personal life
Smart was married to Margaret Morrison, with whom he had three daughters. One of his daughters was Jane Greig Smart, who died in 1952.

Smart's nephew, James, also became a noted architect.

Death
Smart died on 13 October 1914, aged 90, while living at Rockbank in Kinnoull.

References

1824 births
1914 deaths
Architects from Perth, Scotland
19th-century Scottish architects
20th-century Scottish architects